Strontium 90: Police Academy is the only album by Strontium 90, released by Mike Howlett in 1997. This album consists of live tracks recorded at Gong's reunion concert in Paris on 28 May 1977, five studio tracks recorded in London just before the concert, and Sting's solo demo of "Every Little Thing She Does Is Magic".

The back cover of the album falsely claims that these recordings "resulted in the birth of The Police." In fact, The Police had been active for months before any of the recordings were made, save the "Every Little Thing She Does Is Magic" demo (which features only Sting). However, it was at these recording sessions that Sting and Copeland first played with Andy Summers, who later became the Police's guitarist.

The Police would later re-record "Visions of the Night" and use parts of "3 O'Clock Shit" in two of their later compositions, "Be My Girl" and "O My God".

Track listing
All songs written by Mike Howlett, except where noted.

"Visions of the Night" (Sting)
"New World Blues"
"3 O'Clock Shit" (Live) [incorrectly listed as "3 O'Clock Shot"] (Sting)
"Lady of Delight"
"Electron Romance"
"Every Little Thing She Does Is Magic" (Demo) (Sting)
"Towers Tumbled"
"Electron Romance" (Live)
"Lady of Delight" (Live)

The Japanese release (TOCP-50242) and the 2011 reissue contain two extra tracks:
"New World Blues" (Live)
"Towers Tumbled" (Live)

Personnel
Strontium 90
Mike Howlett – lead bass (tracks 5, 7, 8, 11), lead vocals (tracks 7–11), backing vocals (tracks 2 and 4)
Sting – bass (tracks 1, 6, 8, 11), lead vocals (tracks 1–6 and 8), backing vocals, acoustic guitar (track 2 and 6), African drum (track 6)
Andy Summers – electric guitars
Stewart Copeland – drums, miscellaneous percussion

References

1997 albums
Albums produced by Mike Howlett
The Police
Strontium 90 (band) albums
Ark 21 Records albums
Ark 21 Records live albums